The inner plexiform layer is an area of the retina that is made up of a dense reticulum of fibrils formed by interlaced dendrites of retinal ganglion cells and cells of the inner nuclear layer. Within this reticulum a few branched spongioblasts are sometimes embedded.

References

External links
 Overview  at utah.edu
 

Human eye anatomy